Henotheism is the worship of a single, supreme god that does not deny the existence or possible existence of other deities. Friedrich Schelling (1775–1854) coined the word, and Friedrich Welcker (1784–1868) used it to depict primitive monotheism among ancient Greeks.

Max Müller (1823–1900), a German philologist and orientalist, brought the term into wider usage in his scholarship on the Indian religions, particularly Hinduism whose scriptures mention and praise numerous deities as if they are one ultimate unitary divine essence. Müller made the term central to his criticism of Western theological and religious exceptionalism (relative to Eastern religions), focusing on a cultural dogma which held "monotheism" to be both fundamentally well-defined and inherently superior to differing conceptions of God.

Definition and terminology
Friedrich Schelling coined the German term Henotheismus  and German Theismus 'theism' (which comes ). The term refers to a form of theism focused on a single god. Related terms are monolatrism and kathenotheism. The latter term is an extension of "henotheism", . Henotheism refers to a pluralistic theology wherein different deities are viewed to be of a unitary, equivalent divine essence. Another term related to henotheism is "equitheism", referring to the belief that all gods are equal. Further, the term henotheism does not exclude monism, nondualism or dualism.

Various scholars prefer the term monolatrism to henotheism, to discuss religions where a single god is central, but the existence or the position of other gods is not denied. According to Christoph Elsas, henotheism in modern usage connotes a syncretic stage in the development of religions in late antiquity. A henotheist may worship a single god from a pantheon of deities at a given time, depending on his or her choice, while accepting other deities and concepts of god. Henotheism and inclusive monotheism are terms that refer to a middle position between unlimited polytheism and exclusive monotheism.

Zoroastrianism

Ahura Mazda is the supreme god, but Zoroastrianism does not deny other deities. Ahura Mazda has yazatas ("good agents") some of which include Anahita, Sraosha, Mithra, Rashnu, and Tishtrya. Richard Foltz has put forth evidence that Iranians of Pre-Islamic era worshiped all these figures, especially Mithra and Anahita.

Prods Oktor Skjærvø states Zoroastrianism is henotheistic, and "a dualistic and polytheistic religion, but with one supreme god, who is the father of the ordered cosmos". Other scholars state that this is unclear, because historic texts present a conflicting picture, ranging from Zoroastrianism's belief in "one god, two gods, or a best god henotheism".

Hinduism

Henotheism was the term used by scholars such as Max Müller to describe the theology of Vedic religion. Müller noted that the hymns of the Rigveda, the oldest scripture of Hinduism, mention many deities, but praises them successively as the "one ultimate, supreme God", alternatively as "one supreme Goddess", thereby asserting that the essence of the deities was unitary (ekam), and the deities were nothing but pluralistic manifestations of the same concept of the divine (God).

The Vedic era conceptualization of the divine or the One, states Jeaneane Fowler, is more abstract than a monotheistic God, it is the Reality behind and of the phenomenal universe. The Vedic hymns treat it as "limitless, indescribable, absolute principle", thus the Vedic divine is something of a panentheism rather than simple henotheism. In late Vedic era, around the start of Upanishadic age (~800 BCE), theosophical speculations emerge that develop concepts which scholars variously call nondualism or monism, as well as forms of non-theism and pantheism. An example of the questioning of the concept of God, in addition to henotheistic hymns found therein, are in later portions of the Rigveda, such as the Nasadiya Sukta. Hinduism calls the metaphysical absolute concept as Brahman, incorporating within it the transcendent and immanent reality. Different schools of thought interpret Brahman as either personal, impersonal or transpersonal. Ishwar Chandra Sharma describes it as "Absolute Reality, beyond all dualities of existence and non-existence, light and darkness, and of time, space and cause."

Hellenistic religion

While Greek and Roman religion began as polytheism, during the Classical period, under the influence of philosophy, differing conceptions emerged. Often Zeus (or Jupiter) was considered the supreme, all-powerful and all-knowing king and father of the Olympian gods. According to Maijastina Kahlos, "monotheism was pervasive in the educated circles in Late Antiquity" and "all divinities were interpreted as aspects, particles or epithets of one supreme God". Maximus Tyrius (2nd century C.E.) stated: "In such a mighty contest, sedition and discord, you will see one according law and assertion in all the earth, that there is one God, the king and father of all things, and many gods, sons of God, ruling together with him."

The Neoplatonic philosopher Plotinus taught that above the gods of traditional belief was "The One", and the polytheist grammarian Maximus of Madauros even stated that only a madman would deny the existence of the supreme God.

Canaanite religion and Yahwism
Second Temple Judaism and Rabbinical Judaism are emphatically monotheistic. However, its predecessor—the cult of Yahweh as it was practiced in ancient Israel during the 8th and 7th centuries BCE (Yahwism)—has been described as henotheistic or monolatric.

For example, the Moabites worshipped the god Chemosh, the Edomites, Qaus, both of whom were part of the greater Canaanite pantheon, headed by the chief god, El. The Canaanite pantheon consisted of El and Asherah as the chief deities, with 70 sons who were said to rule over each of the nations of the earth. These sons were each worshiped within a specific region. Kurt Noll states that "the Bible preserves a tradition that Yahweh used to 'live' in the south, in the land of Edom" and that the original god of Israel was El Shaddai.

Several biblical stories allude to the belief that the Canaanite gods all existed and were thought to possess the most power in the lands by the people who worshiped them and their sacred objects; their power was believed to be real and could be invoked by the people who patronized them. There are numerous accounts of surrounding nations of Israel showing fear or reverence for the Israelite God despite their continued polytheistic practices. For instance, in 1 Samuel 4, the Philistines fret before the second battle of Aphek when they learn that the Israelites are bearing the Ark of the Covenant, and therefore Yahweh, into battle. The Israelites were forbidden to worship other deities, but according to some interpretations of the Bible, they were not fully monotheistic before the Babylonian captivity.  Mark S. Smith refers to this stage as a form of monolatry. Smith argues that Yahweh underwent a process of merging with El and that acceptance of cults of Asherah was common in the period of the Judges. 2 Kings 3:27 has been interpreted as describing a human sacrifice in Moab that led the invading Israelite army to fear the power of Chemosh.

In Christianity 
Paul the Apostle, in his First Epistle to the Corinthians, writes that "we know that an idol is nothing" and "that there is none other God but one" He argues in verse 5 that "for though there be that are called gods, whether in heaven or in earth", "but to us there is but one God". Some translators of verse 5, put the words "gods" and "lords" in quotes to indicate that they are gods or lords only so-called.

In his Second Epistle to the Corinthians, Paul refers to "the god of this world", which the 18th-century theologian John Gill interpreted as a reference to Satan or the material things put before God, such as money, rather than acknowledging any separate deity from God.

The Church of Jesus Christ of Latter-day Saints
Some scholars have written that the Church of Jesus Christ of Latter-day Saints (LDS Church) can be characterized as henotheistic, but others have rejected that stance.

Eugene England, a professor at Brigham Young University, asserted that LDS Presidents Brigham Young and Joseph Fielding Smith along with the LDS scholar B. H. Roberts used the LDS interpretation of 1 Corinthians 8:5–6 as "a brief explanation of how it is possible to be both a Christian polytheist (technically a henotheist) and a monotheist". BYU Professor Roger R. Keller rejected descriptions of the LDS Church as polytheistic by countering, as summarized by a reviewer, "Mormons are fundamentally monotheistic because they deal with only one god out of the many which exist."

In their book, Mormon America: The Power and the Promise, Richard and Joan Ostling, wrote that some Mormons are comfortable describing themselves as henotheists.

Kurt Widmer, professor at the University of Lethbridge, described LDS beliefs as a "cosmic henotheism". A review of Widmer's book by Bruening and Paulsen in the FARMS Review of Books countered that Widmer's hypothesis was "strongly disconfirmed in light of the total evidence".

Van Hale has written, "Mormonism teaches the existence of gods who are not the Father, Son, or Holy Ghost" and "the existence of more than one god [is] clearly a Mormon doctrine", but he also said that defining this belief system in theological terms was troublesome. Henotheism might appear to be "promising" in describing LDS beliefs, Hale wrote, but it is ultimately not accurate because henotheism was intended to describe the worship of a god that was restricted to a specific geographical area.

See also
 Comparative religion
 Henosis, mystical "oneness", "union", or "unity" in classical Greek
 King of the gods, a tendency for one divinity, usually male, to achieve preeminence.

References

External links
 What are Henotheism and Monolatry? in About Religion
 On Henotheism in Sofiatopia

Monotheism
Polytheism
Theism
Religion in ancient Israel and Judah